Kristin Lynn Hildebrand (née Richards, born June 30, 1985) is an American indoor volleyball player. She was on the United States national team that won the 2014 World Championship gold medal.

Career
She played college women's volleyball at Stanford University.

Hildebrand was part of the USA national team that won the 2014 World Championship gold medal when the team defeated China 3-1 in the final match.

Clubs
  Fakel Novy Urengoy (2008–09)
  Omichka Omsk (2009–10)
  Lokomotiv Baku (2010–11)
  Spes Volley Conegliano (2011)
  River Volley Piacenza (2012)
  Yeşilyurt Istanbul (2012–13)
  Campinas Vôlei (2013–14)
  Fenerbahçe Istanbul (2014–15)
  Impel Wroclaw (2015–2016)

Awards

College
 2004 NCAA –  Champion with Stanford
 2006 NCAA –  Runner-Up with Stanford

Clubs
 2010–11 Challenge Cup –  Runner-Up with Lokomotiv Baku
 2014–15 Turkish Cup –  Champion with Fenerbahçe Grundig
 2014–15 Turkish Women's Volleyball League –  Champion, with Fenerbahçe Grundig
 2015–16 Polish ORLEN Liga –  Bronze medal, with Impel Wroclaw

References

1985 births
Living people
American women's volleyball players
Stanford Cardinal women's volleyball players
Sportspeople from Provo, Utah
Volleyball players at the 2015 Pan American Games
Pan American Games gold medalists for the United States
Pan American Games medalists in volleyball
Outside hitters
Expatriate volleyball players in Russia
Expatriate volleyball players in Azerbaijan
Expatriate volleyball players in Italy
Expatriate volleyball players in Turkey
Expatriate volleyball players in Brazil
Expatriate volleyball players in Poland
American expatriate sportspeople in Russia
American expatriate sportspeople in Azerbaijan
American expatriate sportspeople in Italy
American expatriate sportspeople in Turkey
American expatriate sportspeople in Brazil
American expatriate sportspeople in Poland
Yeşilyurt volleyballers
Medalists at the 2015 Pan American Games